Football at the 2003 Afro-Asian Games was held in Hyderabad, India from 22 to 31 October 2003. The football preliminaries commenced two days before the Opening Ceremony of the Games.

The football tournament was a men's-only event. Eight teams were set to participate, but only 7 played. Uzbekistan were the gold medalists. The host country took silver, while Zimbabwe won bronze.

Original setting and withdrawals

Initially, eight teams were set to participate in the football events - India, Uzbekistan, Zimbabwe, Rwanda, Iran, Malaysia, Cameroon and Burkina Faso. However, Cameroon withdrew, and Ghana was decided to replace Cameroon.

Just before the preliminaries were to begin, Ghana pulled out of the football events, leaving only seven teams participating.

Venues

The football events were held in two stadiums - the GMC Balayogi Athletic Stadium, which was the main stadium of the Games; and the Lal Bahadur Shastri Stadium. The football finals were held in the latter stadium.

Group A

Matches

Group B
Iran were represented by club side Malavan Bandar Anzali Football Club. Cameroon were replaced by Zimbabwe.

Matches

Knockout stage

Overall ranking

References

External links
 

2003
A
2003 Afro-Asian Games
2003
As